Skooba Design is an American company which designs and manufactures carrying cases and accessories.

Founded in Rochester, New York in 1999 by Michael Hess, the company's products include laptop, iPad/tablet, photo/video bags, and other laptop-compatible luggage. It offers its products primarily online.

History
Hess founded the company in Rochester, New York in 1999 as a subsidiary of Three Point Ventures, LLC. It was founded under the name RoadWired, and changed its name to Skooba Design in August 2007.

In 2014, Skooba was bought by Buffalo, New York manufacturer and distributor, Norazza, Inc. Norazza, Inc.'s acquisition of Skooba allowed for large-scale distribution of the company's products. Norazza, Inc. also bought Skooba's sister company HotDog Yoga in the deal. Skooba products are made in the United States.

References

External links
 Official Skooba Design website
 Laptop Skin

Design companies of the United States
Product designers
Companies based in Rochester, New York
Design companies established in 2000
2000 establishments in New York (state)